Ji Zebiao (born 3 August 1964) is a Chinese former pole vaulter who competed in the 1984 Summer Olympics.

References

1964 births
Living people
Chinese male pole vaulters
Olympic athletes of China
Athletes (track and field) at the 1984 Summer Olympics
Asian Games medalists in athletics (track and field)
Athletes (track and field) at the 1986 Asian Games
Asian Games gold medalists for China
Medalists at the 1986 Asian Games
People from Ledong Li Autonomous County